MMS may refer to:

Science and technology

Network communication protocols 
 Multimedia Messaging Service for mobile phones
 Microsoft Media Server, a content-streaming  protocol (mms://)
 Manufacturing Message Specification for real time process data

Other 
 Magnetospheric Multiscale Mission, NASA
 Massachusetts Medical Society
 Methyl methanesulfonate
 Moment magnitude scale of earthquake energy
Multiscale Modeling and Simulation journal

Schools

Modern Montessori School, Amman, Jordan
Marshall Middle School (Pittsburgh), US
Mayo Clinic School of Medicine, US, formerly Mayo Medical School
Margaret Mace School, the only school of the North Wildwood School District

Government and politics
Minerals Management Service, former U.S. agency
Movimento Mérito e Sociedade (Merit and Society Movement), Portuguese political party

Other uses
 M&M's
 Machinist's mate (shop mechanic), US Navy
 Miracle Mineral Supplement, bleach fraudulently sold as medicine
 M.M.S. (Mobile Missile System), a G.I. Joe playset
 Metropolitan mountaineering society, Philippines
 Metro Manila Subway, an under-construction rapid transit line in Philippines
 Medical Mission Sisters, a religious congregation
 MMS-class minesweeper, a class of British warships
 Master of Management Studies, a postgraduate academic degree course.